Lillinonah may refer to:

Lake Lillinonah, the second largest lake in Connecticut
Lillinonah Trail, a public park in Newtown, Connecticut